Kiełpin may refer to the following places:
Kiełpin, Greater Poland Voivodeship (west-central Poland)
Kiełpin, Kuyavian-Pomeranian Voivodeship (north-central Poland)
Kiełpin, Masovian Voivodeship (east-central Poland)
Kiełpin, Gorzów County in Lubusz Voivodeship (west Poland)
Kiełpin, Zielona Góra County in Lubusz Voivodeship (west Poland)
Kiełpin, Chojnice County in Pomeranian Voivodeship (north Poland)
Kiełpin, Człuchów County in Pomeranian Voivodeship (north Poland)
Kiełpin, West Pomeranian Voivodeship (north-west Poland)